Joe Edwards (born 21 September 1993) is a rugby union footballer who plays as a loose forward for the RC Vannes in France's Rugby Pro D2. He made his provincial debut during the 2012 season against Manawatu and to date has made 9 appearances and scored 1 try. Joe previously went to Edgewater College (2007–09) and Saint Kentigern College (2010–11) and was in the First XV at both schools.

He is the Great nephew of Sam Edwards former NZ Kiwi rugby league player.

His impressive performances at domestic level have seen him named in the  Wider Training Squad for the 2013 Super Rugby season. He was subsequently upgraded to a first-team contract for 2015.

Notes

External links
 Joe Edwards itsrugby.co.uk Player Statistics

1993 births
New Zealand rugby union players
New Zealand Māori rugby union players
Rugby union flankers
Auckland rugby union players
Blues (Super Rugby) players
Living people
Rugby union players from Auckland
People educated at Saint Kentigern College
Union Bordeaux Bègles players
New Zealand expatriate rugby union players
New Zealand expatriate sportspeople in France
Expatriate rugby union players in France
Provence Rugby players
Rugby Club Vannes players